Jacob or Jake Jacobs may refer to:

 Jacob Jacobs (artist) (1812–1879), Belgian landscape and orientalist painter
 Jacob Jacobs (theater) (1890–1977), Hungarian-born American Yiddish theater producer, actor and songwriter
 Jake Jacobs (1937–2010), American baseball player